Nasir is a city in Latjoor, in the Greater Upper Nile region of northeastern South Sudan. It is the administrative center of Luakpiny/Nasir County.

Early days
Charles W. Gwynn passed through this town while he was reconnoitering the Ethiopia–Sudan border in March 1900. There he found "a young Egyptian officer in charge of a small Government post, but he apparently had had no communications with anyone since the river Sobat had fallen, and was anxiously awaiting its rise in hopes of a steamer to replenish his stores."

Civil war

SPLA-Nasir, a splinter faction of the Sudan People's Liberation Army active from 1991 to 1994, derived their name from the town because it was their base.

In 1991 local rebel leader Riek Machar used Nasir as his base of operations. There he met Emma McCune, a British aid worker who he later married. She died in Nairobi in November 1993 in a traffic accident. In May 1991 large numbers of refugees fleeing the civil war in Ethiopia descended on Nasir, swelling the local population from a few hundred to tens of thousands.

UN Operation Lifeline Sudan subsequently used Nasir as a major distribution point for WFP food distributions and UNICEF operations. These included rinderpest vaccinations of the local cattle population, meningitis vaccination programs, seed and tool inputs as well as emergency feeding programs.

The local airstrip is reputed to have been built by the RAF in the 1930s as a point en route from Khartoum to Nairobi. It was used as a fuel stop for RAF aircraft operations in North and East Africa.

References

External links

Populated places in Upper Nile (state)
Greater Upper Nile